The UCI Track Cycling World Championships – Men's sprint is the world championship sprint event held annually at the UCI Track Cycling World Championships. Between its inception and 1992, the sprint was separated into two events; one for professionals and one for amateurs. From 1993, all competitors competed in one open event. It was first held at the 1895 championships, two years after the first amateur sprint world championship. , Koichi Nakano from Japan has won the most titles with ten consecutive professional wins between 1977 and 1986.

Medalists

Medal table

See also
Keirin
UCI Track Cycling World Championships – Women's sprint
Track cycling at the Summer Olympics – Men's sprint

Notes

References

External links
Track Cycling World Championships 2016–1893 bikecult.com
World Championship, Track, Sprint, Elite cyclingarchives.com

 
Men's sprint
Lists of UCI Track Cycling World Championships medalists